Penn State Public Broadcasting may refer to:
 WPSU (FM) 
WPSU-TV